Pancovia is a genus of flowering plants belonging to the family Sapindaceae.

Its native range is Tropical and Southern Africa.

Species
Species:

Pancovia bijuga 
Pancovia floribunda 
Pancovia golungensis 
Pancovia harmsiana 
Pancovia hildebrandtii 
Pancovia holtzii 
Pancovia laurentii 
Pancovia letestui 
Pancovia lubiniana 
Pancovia polyantha 
Pancovia sessiliflora 
Pancovia subcuneata 
Pancovia turbinata

References

Sapindaceae
Sapindaceae genera